Renova (full name: Renova - Fábrica de Papel do Almonda, SA) is a Portuguese company that produces paper consumption goods (such as tissues and toilet paper). It is based in the city of Torres Novas, located in Médio Tejo, a NUTS3 subregion belonging to Centro region.
It is one of the most well-known industry brands inside and outside of the country.
Their products are sold and advertised in countries like Japan, France, the UK, the United States, Belgium, and Spain.

Products
Renova's main products are tissues for domestic and sanitary use such as toilet paper, kitchen rolls, napkins, handkerchiefs, facials. Renova is also present in feminine hygiene products, wet wipes, and printing & writing paper. A major success in recent years is the unique Renova Black Toilet Tissue.

Brand
It became known to a wider public (outside of Portugal) through an advertising campaign (first launched in 2002) that made use of sex appeal to sell toilet paper - something other companies didn't dare to do before. The campaign, using photos made by the French photographer François Rousseau, received special attention of the French magazine Photo, which promoted a photographic contest inspired by it (and sponsored by the company).

2017 New paper mill, Renova PM07 starts operating in Torres Novas, pioneering the new NTT technology for paper making in Europe.
2016 New factory, Renova 3, inaugurated in France, Saint-Yorre.
2015 Exports to 90 world countries are now becoming regular.
2014 Renova starts its operations in Mexico under the brand novaRe.
2013 Renova starts its operations in Canada.
2012 Marketing Case Study of Portugal’s Renova Black Toilet Paper is #1 in global case study award 
2011 Renova Mills no1 and no2 receive more than 6.000 students a year, from all ages.
2010 Renova, a business case study at INSEAD: "Renova Toilet Paper: Escaping the Commoditization Trap"
2009 New large scale automatic warehousing facilities and many new automated converting lines. New natural gas electrical co-generation central.
2007 New business unit to explore the brand presence in markets not previously explored, with a global scope.
2006 For the first time, a Renova product is reviewed by major national newspapers and fashion magazines across the globe.
2005 After launching Renova Black, the first black toilet paper ever, new trade channels across the globe become interested in the product.
2004 Renova Belgium starts its operations in Belgium and Luxembourg. 
2003 Renova launches its first moist toilet paper product lines.
2002 Renova France starts operations in France, using its innovative “Fresh&Clean” toilet paper as main market driver.
1999 Renova acquires the water company Promineral SA.
1999 ISO 14001 certification, for environmental compliance, is granted to Renova SA, which becomes the first company with such certification in Spain and Portugal.
1998 Launch of the first toilet paper in the world integrating micro-droplets of smoothing cream (“Renova Fresh&Clean”).
1995 Major branding reform takes place, with all products starting to carry the brand name “Renova”.
1990 Renova España SA begins its operations in Spain.
1989 The first modern cross-category line of products is launched (“Renova Class”).
1979 Mill number 2 is inaugurated.
1970 First feminine hygiene line of products is launched (“Reglex”).
1961 The modification of the business structure is completed: from office paper to disposable household and body paper products.
1958 The company launches “Renova Super”, the best selling product of the company ever.
1950 Acquisition of a dedicated high voltage power line complementing the main energy source of the factory: the river.
1943 A new group of stockholders takes hold of the company. Renova – Fábrica de Papel do Almonda, SA is born.
1939 Foundation of the private company Fábrica de Papel do Almonda Lda. 
1818 David Ardisson chose the Renova brand as the watermark for the first sheet of paper manufactured on the banks of Almonda river, Torres Novas

References

External links

 Renova

Pulp and paper companies of Portugal
Portuguese brands
Torres Novas